Fath-Ali Shah Qajar (May 1769 – 24 October 1834) was the second Shah (king) of Qajar Iran. He reigned from 17 June 1797 until his death on 24 October 1834. His reign saw the irrevocable ceding of Iran's northern territories in the Caucasus, comprising what is nowadays Georgia, Dagestan, Azerbaijan, and Armenia, to the Russian Empire following the Russo-Persian Wars of 1804–1813 and 1826–1828 and the resulting treaties of Gulistan and Turkmenchay. Historian Joseph M. Upton says that he "is famous among Iranians for three things: his exceptionally long beard, his wasp-like waist, and his progeny."

At the end of his reign, his difficult economic problems and military and technological liabilities took Iran to the verge of governmental disintegration, which was quickened by a consequent struggle for the throne after his death.

Under Fath-Ali Shah, many visual portrayals of himself and his court were created in an effort to commend the crown. These notable include rock reliefs next to the ones erected under the pre-Islamic Sasanian Empire (224–651) in Ray, Fars and Kermanshah. This was done so that he could represent himself as heir to the ancient Persian Empire to his countryfolk and the generations that followed.

Early life
He was born in May 1769 in the city of Damghan, then under the governorship of his father. He was called Fath-Ali, a name borne by his prominent great-grandfather. But he was mainly known by his second name of Baba Khan until his coronation in 1797. However, the Russians still called him Baba Khan until 1813, as they refused to recognize his rule. He was the eldest son of Hossein Qoli Khan Qajar (the brother of Agha Mohammad Khan Qajar) and the daughter of the Mohammad Agha Ezz al-Dinlu of the Ashaqa-bash branch of the Qajar tribe. Due to Hossein Qoli Khan being suspected of plotting to rebel against the Zand dynasty, Baba Khan (then aged five) was sent as a hostage to the court of the Zand ruler Karim Khan Zand in Shiraz. There Baba Khan joined his uncle Agha Mohammad Khan, who was also a hostage at the court.

Baba Khan later returned to Damghan (according to the 19th-century Iranian writer Reza-Qoli Khan Hedayat, this took place in 1775), where he was witness to the conflict amongst the Davallu Qajar chiefs of Astarabad, which ultimately led to the murder of his father by the Kuklan Turkmens in 1777. Baba Khan sought shelter with his uncle Morteza Qoli Khan Qajar in the village of Anzan (near Astarabad), where he stayed for two years. Following the death of Karim Khan in 1779, Baba Khan shifted his allegiance to Agha Mohammad Khan, who had returned to Mazandaran and overpowered Morteza Qoli and two other brothers in Barforush. Albeit Agha Mohammad Khan had been castrated at a young age, he married Baba Khan's mother in Sari and practically became his stepfather and guardian.

In 1780, Baba Khan and Agha Mohammad Khan were captured in Baforush by the latters brother Rezaqoli Khan Qajar, who was displeased of the favour that Baba Khan received by Agha Mohammad Khan. They were eventually released, and in 1781 Baba Khan seized Damghan from Qader Khan Arab Bestami, thus recovering his father's former domain. Baba Khan also captured and married Qader Khan's daughter Badr Jahan. In 1783, Baba Khan married his first Qajar wife, Asiyeh Khanum in Sari. The marriage was a political union organized by Agha Mohammad Khan to make peace with the Yokhari-bash branch of the Qajars, the clan of Asiyeh Khanum. Following Agha Mohammad Khan's accession to the throne at Tehran in 21 March 1786, Baba Khan was designated as his heir and vice-regent.

Baba Khan took part in his uncle's war with the Zands in southern Iran, where he in 1787 narrowly succeeded in defeating the governor of Yazd, Mohammad-Taqi Bafqi, who acknowledged Qajar suzerainty. Baba Khan then went to Gilan to protect it against Qajar chiefs whose loyalty was questionable.

Baba Khan was governor of Fars when his uncle was assassinated in 1797. Baba Khan then ascended the throne and used the name of Fath Ali Shah (with the word "shah" added on his name). He became suspicious of his chancellor Ebrahim Khan Kalantar and ordered his execution. Hajji Ebrahim Khan had been chancellor to Zand and Qajar rulers for some fifteen years. Much of his reign was marked by the resurgence of Persian arts and painting, as well as a deeply elaborate court culture with extremely rigid etiquette. In particular during his reign, portraiture and large-scale oil painting reached a height previously unknown under any other Islamic dynasty, largely due to his personal patronage.

Fath Ali also ordered the creation of much royal regalia, including coronations chairs; the "Takht-e Khurshīd" or Sun Throne; the "Takht-e Nāderi" or Naderi Throne, which was also used by later kings; and the "Tāj-e Kiyāni" or Kiani Crown, a modification of the crown of the same name created by his uncle Agha Mohammad Khan. The latter, like most of his regalia, was studded with a large number of pearls and gems.

In 1797, Fath Ali was given a complete set of the Britannica's 3rd edition, which he read completely; after this feat, he extended his royal title to include "Most Formidable Lord and Master of the Encyclopædia Britannica." In 1803, Fath-Ali Shah appointed his cousin Ebrahim Khan as the governor of the Kerman Province, which had been devastated during the reign of Agha Mohammad Khan.

In Khorasan, there would be a growing revolt led by Nader Mirza, who would restore the Afsharid dynasty. The Shah's control was so limited in fact that an 1800–1801 tax register listed only Sabzevar and Neyshabur as paying taxes to the government, while the rest of the local Khorasani leaders paid no taxes to the state at all.

Russo-Persian wars (1804–1828)

Russo-Persian War (1804–1813)

During the early reign of Fath Ali Shah, Imperial Russia took control of Georgia, a territory which Iran had ruled intermittently since 1555 with the Peace of Amasya. Georgia, led by Erekle II, had forged an alliance with Persia's rival, Russia, following the Treaty of Georgievsk. To punish his Georgian subjects, his uncle, Agha Mohammad Khan, had invaded and sacked Tbilisi, seeking to reestablishing full Persian suzerainty over Georgia, in which he succeeded. Even though the Russian garrisons in the city had to retreat, Persia didn't manage to put back all of its needed garrisons over the country as Agha Mohammad Khan was assassinated soon afterwards in Shusha, following with Russia's act of annexation of those priorly-Iranian ruled parts of Georgia in 1801, after many Georgian embassies and a treaty. Also, not only was Georgia annexed but Dagestan was also invaded, which had also been under Persian rule since the early Safavid era. As it was seen as a direct intrusion into Persian territory, Fath Ali Shah, determined to reassert Persian hegemony over the whole region, declared war on Russia after General Pavel Tsitsianov attacked and stormed the city of Ganja, massacring many of its inhabitants and forcing many thousands to flee deeper within the Iranian domains. In 1804, Fath Ali Shah ordered the invasion of Georgia in order to regain it, under pressure from the Shia clergy, who were urging a war against Russia. The war began with notable victories for the Persians, but Russia shipped in advanced weaponry and cannons that disadvantaged the technologically inferior Qajar forces, who did not have the artillery to match. Russia continued with a major campaign against Persia; Persia asked for help from Britain on the grounds of a military agreement with that country (the military agreement was signed after the rise of Napoleon in France). However, Britain refused to help Persia claiming that the military agreement concerned a French attack not Russian.

Persia had to ask for help from France, sending an ambassador to Napoleon and concluding a Franco-Persian alliance with the signature of the Treaty of Finkenstein. However, just when the French were ready to help Persia, Napoleon made peace with Russia. At this time, John Malcolm arrived in Persia and promised support but Britain later changed its mind and asked Persia to retreat. Though many years the war had been stale and located in various parts of Transcaucasia, the peace with Napoleon enabled the Russians to increase their war efforts in the Caucasus against Iran. In early 1813, under General Pyotr Kotlyarevsky, the Russians successfully stormed Lankaran. Russian troops invaded Tabriz in 1813 and Persia was forced to sign the Treaty of Gulistan with Russia.

Treaty of Gulistan

On account of consecutive defeats of Persia and after the fall of Lankaran on 1 January 1813, Fath Ali Shah, was forced to sign the disastrous Treaty of Gulistan. The text of treaty was prepared by a British diplomat; Sir Gore Ouseley; and was signed by Nikolai Fyodorovich Rtischev from the Russian side and Hajji Mirza Abol Hasan Khan from the Iranian side on 24 October 1813 in the village of Gulistan.

By this treaty all of the cities, towns, and villages of Georgia, villages and towns on the coast of the Black Sea, all of the cities, towns and villages of the Khanates in the South Caucasus and North Caucasus, and part of the Talysh Khanate, including Megrelia, Abkhazia, Imeretia, Guria, Baku khanate, Shirvan Khanate, Derbent, Karabakh khanate, Ganja khanate, Shaki Khanate and Quba Khanate became part of Russia. These territories altogether comprise modern-day Georgia, southern Dagestan, and most of the contemporary Azerbaijan Republic. In return, Russia pledged to support Abbas Mirza as heir to the Persian throne after the death of Fath Ali Shah.

Interlude on a different front
Between 1805 and 1816, Qajar rulers began invading Herat in neighboring Afghanistan with small detachments. The Persians were attempting to retake control of the city but were forced to abandon it due to Afghan uprisings. In 1818 the Shah sent his son Mohammad Vali Mirza to capture the city but he was defeated at the Battle of Kafir Qala.

Russo-Persian War (1826–1828)

In 1826, 13 years after the Treaty of Gulistan, the Shah on the advice of British agents and the utter dissatisfaction with the outcome of the previous war, Fath Ali Shah decided to occupy the lost territories. Crown prince Abbas Mirza, head of the armies, invaded the Talysh Khanate and Karabakh khanate with an army of 35,000 on 16 July 1826. The first year of the war was very successful, and the Persians managed to regain most of their lost territories of the 1804–1813 war, including the principal cities of Lenkoran, Quba, and Baku. However the tide turned after the winter. In May 1827, Ivan Paskevich, Governor of Caucasus, invaded Echmiadzin, Nakhichevan, Abbasabad and on 1 October Erivan. Fourteen days later, General Eristov entered Tabriz. In January 1828, when the Russians reached the shores of Lake Urmia, Abbas Mirza urgently signed the Treaty of Turkmenchay on 2 February 1828.

Treaty of Turkmenchay

The Turkmenchay Treaty was signed on 21 February 1828 by Hajji Mirza Abol Hasan Khan and General Ivan Paskevich. By this treaty the Erivan khanate (most of present-day Armenia, and also a small part of Eastern Anatolia), Nakhchivan khanate (most of the present-day Nakhchivan Autonomous Republic of Azerbaijan), the Talysh Khanate (southeastern Azerbaijan), and the Ordubad and Mughan came under the rule of Imperial Russia. By this treaty, Iran had lost all of its Caucasian territories comprising all of Transcaucasia and Dagestan to neighboring Imperial Russia. Iran furthermore pledged to pay Russia 10 Million in Gold, and in return Russia pledged to support Abbas Mirza as heir to the Persian throne after the death of Fath Ali Shah. The treaty also stipulated the resettlement of Armenians from Persia to the Caucasus, which also included an outright liberation of Armenian captives who were brought and had lived in Iran since 1804 or as far back as 1795.

Later life

Fath Ali later employed writers and painters to make a book about his wars with Russia, inspired by the Shahnameh of Ferdowsi. This book, considered by many to be the most important Persian book written in the Qajar period, is called the Shahanshahnama.

In 1829, Alexandr Griboyedov, the Russian diplomat and playwright was killed in the encirclement of the Russia embassy in Tehran. To apologize, the Shah sent prince Khosrow Mirza to Tsar Nicholas I to deliver a formal apology, as well as one of the biggest diamonds of his crown jewelry, namely Shah Diamond.

When his favourite son and crown prince Abbas Mirza died on 25 October 1833, Fath Ali named his grandson Mohammed Mirza as his crown prince. Fath Ali died a year later, on 24 October 1834. He was buried in a tomb in the Fatima Masumeh Shrine of Qom.

He is instantly recognizable in all 25 known portraits – mainly due to his immense, deeply black beard, which reached well beneath his narrow waist. One of these portraits is being exhibited in the collection of the University of Oxford. Another one that of which artist was Mihr Ali is at the Brooklyn Museum.

Besides eulogistic chronicles, the only real sources that allow us to judge his personality are those of British, French and Russian diplomats. These vary greatly: earlier in his reign they tend to portray him as vigorous, manly and highly intelligent. Later they begin to point out his extreme indolence and avarice. The image of decadence was epitomised by the story that he had a special harem slide of marble constructed. Every day he would lie on his back naked "as, one by one, naked harem beauties swooped down a slide, specially made for the sport, into the arms of their lord and master before being playfully dunked in a pool."

Titles 
Fath-Ali Shah used both the ancient Persian title of shahanshah (King of Kings) and the Turco-Mongol title of khaqan (khan of khans), thus representing himself as both ruler of the country and the tribes.

Appearance 
Fath-Ali Shah was the last Qajar shah to dress in the traditional manner, which included a decorated Persian long robe, high heels, and a long beard. The Scottish statesman and historian John Malcolm, who met Fath-Ali Shah in 1800, described him as a "above the middle size, his age little more than thirty, his complexion rather fair, his features regular and fine, with an expression denoting quickness and intelligence."

Legacy 
During his reign, Fath-Ali Shah successfully revamped his realm from a mostly Turkic tribal khanship into a centralized and stable monarchy based on the old imperial design.

Marriage and children

Fath-Ali Shah is reported to have had more than 1,000 spouses. He was survived by fifty-seven sons and forty-six daughters, along with 296 grandsons and 292 granddaughters.

A book published in England in 1874 provided different numbers:

"It is believed that Fetteh Ali had the largest number of children ever born to a man. Like a pious Mohammedan, he had only four wives, but his harem generally contained from 800 to 1,000 ladies. By these he had 130 sons and 150 daughters, and it is believed that at the time of his death his descendants numbered five thousand souls. The three grandsons who merit notice were the sons of Hussein Ali, the governor of Fars, who aspired to the throne. The princes, Riza Kuli Mirza, Nejeff Kuli Mirza, and Timour Mirza, were at Shiraz when their father attempted to seize the throne. They were able to make their escape from the city."

While this is a large number of children, the claim that Fatḥ-ʻAli holds the record is not true. (Moulay Ismail ibn Sharif, who lived a hundred years earlier in Morocco, is said to hold the record for the most number of children born to a man.)

Fatḥ-Ali's first son, Mohammad Ali Mirza Dowlat Shah, was seven months older than the second son Abbas Mirza. Yet it was the latter who was named "Wali-ahd" or crown prince. This was on account of the fact that Dowlat Shah's mother, Ziba Chehreh Khanoum, was of non-Qajar origin (she was Georgian woman), and therefore he was passed over in favour of his younger brother.

Consorts
 Ziba Chehar Khanum, a Georgian woman from the Tzicara Chwili family;
 Badr Jahan Khanum, daughter of Muhammad Jafar Khan Bastami Arab;
 Asiyeh Khanum "Mehd-i-aulya", daughter of Fath Ali Khan Davallu;
 Nushafrin Khanum, a Zand woman;
 Maryam Khanom, a Jewish woman from Mazandaran;
 Hajiyeh Badr al-Nesa Khanum Badran, daughter of Mustafa Quli Khan Qajar Qavanlu;
 Kheyr al-Nessa Khanum (Aay Baaji), daughter of Majnoun Khan Pazouki, daughter of Morteza Qoli Khan Qajar Qavanlu;
 Tawus Khanum "Taj-al-Dawleh", a Georgian concubine from Esfahan.
 Golbadan Baji Khanum "Khazen-ol-Dowleh", a Georgian concubine, originally a woman in service to Fath Ali Shah's mother;
 Kulsum Khanum, a woman from the family of Sayyeds of Pazvar;
 Begum Jan Khanum, a woman from Qazvin;
 Agha Baji Begum, daughter of Ibrahim Khalil Khan of Karabakh;
 A daughter of Sadiq Khan Shaqaqi of Sarab Khanate;
 Gul Pirhan Khanum, an Armenian concubine from Tbilisi;
 Humai Khanum, a Kurdish woman from Mazandaran;
 A daughter of Imam Qoli Khan Afsar Urumi;
 Sunbul Khanum, a prisoner taken by Agha Mohammad Khan;
 Khatun Jan Khanum, sister of Gulrukh Khanum, wife of Farukh Khan Amin-al-Dawleh;
 Mihr al-Nesa Khanum, sister of Mahmud Khan Dunbuli;

Sons

 Mohammad Ali Mirza 'Dowlatshah' (1788–1821) – with Ziba Chehr Khanum;
 Abbas Mirza 'Nayeb os-Saltaneh' (1789–1833) – with Asiyeh Khanum;
 Hossein Ali Mirza 'Farman Farma' (1789–1835) – with Badr Jahan Khanum;
 Hassan Ali Mirza 'Etemad os-Saltaneh' 'Shoja os-Saltaneh' (1789–1854) – with Badr Jahan Khanum;
 Ali Shah Mirza 'Zell os-Soltan' (1789–1854)- with Asiyeh Khanum;
 Mohammad Taqi Mirza 'Hessam os-Saltaneh' (1791–1853)
 Ali Naqi Mirza 'Rokn od-Doleh' (1793) – with Begum Jan Khanum;
 Sheikh Ali Mirza 'Sheikh ol-Molouk' (1796) – with Hajiye Khanum;
 Abdollah Mirza 'Dara' (1796–1846) – with Kulsum Khanum;
 Imam Verdi Mirza 'Keshikchi Bashi' (1796–1869) – with Begum Jan Khanum;
 Mohammad Reza Mirza 'Afsar' (1797)
 Mahmud Mirza (1799–1835) – with Maryam Khanum;
 Heydar Qoli Mirza (1799) – with Kheyr al-Nesa Khanum;
 Homayoun Mirza (1801–1856/1857) – with Maryam Khanum;
 Allah Verdi Mirza 'Navab' (1801–1843) – with Banafshah Badam Khanum;
 Esma'il Mirza (1802–1853)
 Ahmad Ali Mirza (1804) – with Maryam Khanum;
 Ali Reza Mirza
 Keyghobad Mirza (1806) – with Shah Pasand Khanum;
 Haj Bahram Mirza (1806)
 Shapour Mirza (1807)
 Malek Iraj Mirza (1807)
 Manouchehr Mirza 'Baha ol-Molk'
 Keykavous Mirza (1807) – with Shah Pasand Khanum;
 Malek Ghassem Mirza (1807–1859)
 Shah Qoli Mirza (1808)
 Mohammad Mehdi Mirza 'Zargam ol-Molk' (1808) – with Mushteri Khanum;
 Jahanshah Mirza (1809) – with Maryam Khanum;
 Keykhosrow Mirza 'Sepahsalar' (1809) – with Shah Pasand Khanum;
 Kiomarth Mirza "Il-Khani" (1809–1872/1873)
 Soleiman Mirza 'Shoa od-Doleh' (1810)
 Fathollah Mirza 'Shoa os-Saltaneh' (1811–1869/1870) – with Sunbul Khanum;
 Malek Mansour Mirza (1811)
 Soltan Mohammad Mirza 'Sayf ol-Dowleh' (1812–1899) – with Taj ol-Dowleh
 Bahman Mirza 'Baha od-Doleh' – with Khazin-al-Dawleh;
 Soltan Ebrahim Mirza (1813) – with Begum Jan Khanum;
 Soltan Mostafa Mirza (1813)
 Seyfollah Mirza (Jahanbani) (1814) – with Khazin-al-Dawleh;
 Yahya Mirza (1817) – with Begum Khanum;
 Mohammad Amin Mirza (1819–1886) – with Mushteri Khanum;
 Zakaria Mirza (1819) s.p.
 Farrokhseyr Mirza 'Nayer od-Doleh' (1819) – with Taj-al-Dawleh
 Soltan Hamzeh Mirza (1819)
 Tahmoures Mirza (1820) s.p.
 Aliqoli Mirza 'Etezad os-Saltaneh' (1822) – with Gul Pirhan Khanum;
 Soltan Ahmad Mirza 'Azod od-Doleh' (1824–1901) – with Taj ol-Dowleh;
 Eskandar Mirza 'Saheb Khaghan'
 Parviz Mirza 'Nayer od-Doleh' – with Begum Khanum;
 Jalal al-Din Mirza 'Ehtesham ol-Molk' (1826) – with Humai Khanum;
 Amanollah Mirza 'Agha Lili'
 Soltan Hossein Mirza – with Allahqoz Khanum;
 Hossein Qoli Mirza 'Jahansouz Mirza " 'Amir Toman' (1830–1900/1901) – with Begum Khanum;
 Haj Abbas Qoli Mirza – with Gul Pirhan Khanum;
 Nouroldar Mirza
 Kamran Mirza – with Naneh Khanum;
 Orangzeb Mirza (1830/1831-1867/1868) – with Naneh Khanum;
 Mohammad Hadi Mirza (1832) – with Mushteri Khanum;
Daughters;
 Ziaʾ al-Saltaneh (1799–1873)
 Khadijeh Soltan Begom, "Esmat-ad-Dowleh." Wife of Mirza Ebrahim Khan Nazer (son of Haji Mohammad Hossein Khan Sadr-e Esfahani). They had one daughter and three sons: Sadr ed-Dowleh, Assef ed-Dowleh and Mohammad Bagher Khan
 Sarv-i Jahan Khanum. Wife of the Aga Khan I.

See also
Samson Makintsev
Tangeh Savashi near Tehran, where Fath Ali Shah had a relief carved into the side of a mountain pass.
Imperial Crown Jewels of Persia
Naderi throne
Shah Diamond
Qara Bayat Amirdom

References

Sources
 
 
 
 
 

1769 births
1834 deaths
18th-century monarchs of Persia
19th-century monarchs of Persia
Fath Ali
Field marshals of Iran
Encyclopædia Britannica
People of the Russo-Persian Wars
Shia Muslims
Burials at Fatima Masumeh Shrine
Patrons of the arts